Shock sensitivity is a comparative measure of the sensitivity to sudden compression (by impact or blast) of an explosive chemical compound. Determination of the shock sensitivity of a material intended for practical use is one important aspect of safety testing of explosives. A variety of tests and indices are in use, of which one of the more common is the Rotter Impact Test with results expressed as FoI (Figure of Insensitivity.) At least four other impact tests are in common use, while various "gap tests" are used to measure sensitivity to blast shock.

Sensitivities vary widely
A few materials such as nitrogen triiodide cannot be touched at all without detonating, and so are of purely academic interest. Some other compounds with a high sensitivity to shock, such as nitroglycerin and acetone peroxide, may detonate from a firm jolt and so cannot be legally transported in pure form. Acetone peroxide is often used by amateurs and terrorists as a means to detonate other explosives as well as acting as the main blasting agent, often resulting in injuries or death to those who underestimate its sensitivity. A number of methods are known to desensitize nitroglycerine so that it can be transported for medical uses, and it is also incorporated into other less sensitive explosives, such as dynamites and gelignites.

Many practical commercial materials of intermediate sensitivity, such as gelignites and water gel explosives, can be safely handled as they will not explode from casual shocks such as being dropped or lightly knocked by a tool. However, they may explode if struck forcefully by a metal tool, and would certainly explode in the barrel if they were used in an artillery shell. Reliable initiation of such materials requires the small explosion of a detonator. Apart from this another explosive material such as Armstrong's mixture is also used in commercial markets and even sold to the public in the form of  fireworks, cap guns and party poppers.

Still less sensitive materials such as blasting agents like ANFO, are so insensitive that the impulse from the detonator must be amplified by an explosive booster charge to secure reliable detonation. Some polymer bonded explosives — especially those based on TATB — are designed for use in insensitive munitions, which are unlikely to detonate even if struck by another explosive weapon.

Explosives